A keyhole is an aperture for receiving a key.

Keyhole may also refer to:

 Gravitational keyhole, a region of a large body's orbit that could cause a small body to collide with it
 The Keyhole, a 1933 American film directed by Michael Curtiz
 Keyhole (film), 2011, by Canadian director Guy Maddin
 Keyhole (roller coaster element)
 Keyhole, a region of the sky toward which a telescope cannot point (as in the keyhole problem)
 Keyhole, Inc., a data visualization company acquired by Google
 Keyhole (comics), an alternative comic published in the 1990s
 Key Hole (KH), a series of imaging satellites
 Keyhole surgery
 Keyhole cichlid, a fish from the genus Cleithracara
 Keyhole button closure, a button, usually found on the back of a woman's blouse
 Keyhole Falls, a waterfall in British Columbia, Canada
 Keyhole Glacier, on Baffin Island, Nunavut, Canada
 Keyhole nebula, another name for the Carina Nebula
 A type of cockpit on a kayak or sea kayak 
 The KH-11 KENNEN reconnaissance satellite, codenamed Key Hole
 ″Keyhole″, a short story by Murray Leinster
 Keyhole race, a speed-based equestrian sporting event